The 1984–85 Philadelphia 76ers season was notable for being Charles Barkley's rookie season. Barkley joined a veteran team that included Julius Erving, Moses Malone, and Maurice Cheeks, three players who took Philadelphia to the 1983 NBA championship. The Sixers finished with a regular season record of 58–24, five games behind the Celtics in the Atlantic Division.

In the first round of the playoffs, they beat the Washington Bullets 3–1, and then in the Eastern semi-finals they swept the Milwaukee Bucks. The Sixers in the Eastern Conference Finals were defeated in five games by the Boston Celtics. In the game three loss, Julius Erving was booed by the home Sixer fans. After this series Erving was to play the guard position for the last two years of his career. This was also the final series for Coach Billy Cunningham, who quit and would be replaced by Matt Goukas.

This also was the last full season for Andrew Toney, who would be sidelined the next year with a foot injury and played in only 6 games, and never was able to return to his previous All-Star form.

The team's season roster is featured in the video game NBA 2K16.

NBA Draft
Charles Barkley left before his final year at Auburn and made himself eligible for the 1984 NBA draft. He was selected with the fifth pick in the first round by the Philadelphia 76ers, two slots after the Chicago Bulls drafted Michael Jordan.

Roster

Regular season

Season standings

Record vs. opponents

Game log

Regular season

|- align="center" bgcolor="#ccffcc"
| 1
| October 26, 1984
| Cleveland
| W 111–101
|
|
|
| The Spectrum
| 1–0
|- align="center" bgcolor="#ccffcc"
| 2
| October 27, 1984
| @ Atlanta
| W 111–108
|
|
|
| The Omni
| 2–0
|- align="center" bgcolor="#ccffcc"
| 3
| October 30, 1984
| @ New Jersey
| W 118–96
|
|
|
| Brendan Byrne Arena
| 3–0

|- align="center" bgcolor="#ccffcc"
| 4
| November 2, 1984
| Dallas
| W 107–103
|
|
|
| The Spectrum
| 4–0
|- align="center" bgcolor="#ccffcc"
| 5
| November 7, 1984
| Indiana
| W 134–113
|
|
|
| The Spectrum
| 5–0
|- align="center" bgcolor="#ffcccc"
| 6
| November 9, 1984
| @ Boston
| L 119–130
|
|
|
| Boston Garden
| 5–1
|- align="center" bgcolor="#ffcccc"
| 7
| November 14, 1984
| Detroit
| L 133–137 (OT)
|
|
|
| The Spectrum
| 5–2
|- align="center" bgcolor="#ccffcc"
| 8
| November 16, 1984
| @ Detroit
| W 101–90
|
|
|
| Pontiac Silverdome
| 6–2
|- align="center" bgcolor="#ccffcc"
| 9
| November 17, 1984
| @ Chicago
| W 109–100
|
|
|
| Chicago Stadium
| 7–2
|- align="center" bgcolor="#ffcccc"
| 10
| November 20, 1984
| Washington
| L 105–120
|
|
|
| The Spectrum
| 7–3
|- align="center" bgcolor="#ccffcc"
| 11
| November 21, 1984
| @ Indiana
| W 112–107
|
|
|
| Market Square Arena
| 8–3
|- align="center" bgcolor="#ccffcc"
| 12
| November 23, 1984
| @ Phoenix
| W 119–117 (OT)
|
|
|
| Arizona Veterans Memorial Coliseum
| 9–3
|- align="center" bgcolor="#ffcccc"
| 13
| November 24, 1984
| @ Denver
| L 110–114
|
|
|
| McNichols Sports Arena
| 9–4
|- align="center" bgcolor="#ccffcc"
| 14
| November 27, 1984
| @ Washington
| W 93–89
|
|
|
| Capital Centre
| 10–4
|- align="center" bgcolor="#ccffcc"
| 15
| November 28, 1984
| Indiana
| W 122–101
|
|
|
| The Spectrum
| 11–4
|- align="center" bgcolor="#ccffcc"
| 16
| November 30, 1984
| Portland
| W 126–116
|
|
|
| The Spectrum
| 12–4

|- align="center" bgcolor="#ccffcc"
| 17
| December 2, 1984
| New Jersey
| W 114–112
|
|
|
| The Spectrum
| 13–4
|- align="center" bgcolor="#ccffcc"
| 18
| December 5, 1984
| Milwaukee
| W 112–111
|
|
|
| The Spectrum
| 14–4
|- align="center" bgcolor="#ccffcc"
| 19
| December 7, 19848:00p.m. EST
| L.A. Lakers
| W 122–116
| Malone (35)
| Barkley (15)
| Cheeks (10)
| The Spectrum17,921
| 15–4
|- align="center" bgcolor="#ccffcc"
| 20
| December 9, 1984
| New York
| W 110–94
|
|
|
| The Spectrum
| 16–4
|- align="center" bgcolor="#ffcccc"
| 21
| December 11, 1984
| @ New York
| L 106–110
|
|
|
| Madison Square Garden
| 16–5
|- align="center" bgcolor="#ccffcc"
| 22
| December 12, 1984
| Boston
| W 110–107
|
|
|
| The Spectrum
| 17–5
|- align="center" bgcolor="#ccffcc"
| 23
| December 14, 1984
| @ Milwaukee
| W 115–111
|
|
|
| MECCA Arena
| 18–5
|- align="center" bgcolor="#ccffcc"
| 24
| December 15, 1984
| @ Chicago
| W 114–102
|
|
|
| Chicago Stadium
| 19–5
|- align="center" bgcolor="#ccffcc"
| 25
| December 19, 1984
| San Antonio
| W 123–118
|
|
|
| The Spectrum
| 20–5
|- align="center" bgcolor="#ffcccc"
| 26
| December 21, 1984
| Milwaukee
| L 101–104
|
|
|
| The Spectrum
| 20–6
|- align="center" bgcolor="#ccffcc"
| 27
| December 22, 1984
| New Jersey
| W 107–93
|
|
|
| The Spectrum
| 21–6
|- align="center" bgcolor="#ccffcc"
| 28
| December 25, 1984
| @ Detroit
| W 109–108
|
|
|
| Pontiac Silverdome
| 22–6
|- align="center" bgcolor="#ccffcc"
| 29
| December 28, 1984
| @ Utah
| W 114–111
|
|
|
| Salt Palace Acord Arena
| 23–6
|- align="center" bgcolor="#ccffcc"
| 30
| December 29, 1984
| @ Golden State
| W 109–95
|
|
|
| Oakland-Alameda County Coliseum Arena
| 24–6

|- align="center" bgcolor="#ccffcc"
| 31
| January 1, 1985
| @ Portland
| W 111–106
|
|
|
| Memorial Coliseum
| 25–6
|- align="center" bgcolor="#ccffcc"
| 32
| January 2, 1985
| @ Seattle
| W 118–109
|
|
|
| Kingdome
| 26–6
|- align="center" bgcolor="#ccffcc"
| 33
| January 5, 1985
| @ Milwaukee
| W 110–106
|
|
|
| MECCA Arena
| 27–6
|- align="center" bgcolor="#ccffcc"
| 34
| January 7, 1985
| Phoenix
| W 100–99
|
|
|
| The Spectrum
| 28–6
|- align="center" bgcolor="#ccffcc"
| 35
| January 9, 1985
| Detroit
| W 126–122
|
|
|
| The Spectrum
| 29–6
|- align="center" bgcolor="#ccffcc"
| 36
| January 11, 1985
| Houston
| W 115–108
|
|
|
| The Spectrum
| 30–6
|- align="center" bgcolor="#ccffcc"
| 37
| January 13, 1985
| @ Washington
| W 115–104
|
|
|
| Capital Centre
| 31–6
|- align="center" bgcolor="#ccffcc"
| 38
| January 15, 1985
| @ New York
| W 93–82
|
|
|
| Madison Square Garden
| 32–6
|- align="center" bgcolor="#ccffcc"
| 39
| January 16, 1985
| Atlanta
| W 122–99
|
|
|
| The Spectrum
| 33–6
|- align="center" bgcolor="#ffcccc"
| 40
| January 20, 1985
| @ Boston
| L 97–113
|
|
|
| Boston Garden
| 33–7
|- align="center" bgcolor="#ccffcc"
| 41
| January 22, 1985
| @ Cleveland
| W 101–100
|
|
|
| Richfield Coliseum
| 34–7
|- align="center" bgcolor="#ffcccc"
| 42
| January 25, 198511:30p.m. EST
| @ L.A. Lakers
| L 104–109
| Toney (30)
| Malone (14)
| Cheeks, Toney (9)
| The Forum17,505
| 34–8
|- align="center" bgcolor="#ccffcc"
| 43
| January 26, 1985
| @ L.A. Clippers
| W 120–113
|
|
|
| Los Angeles Memorial Sports Arena
| 35–8
|- align="center" bgcolor="#ffcccc"
| 44
| January 28, 1985
| @ Dallas
| L 109–111
|
|
|
| Reunion Arena
| 35–9
|- align="center" bgcolor="#ccffcc"
| 45
| January 30, 1985
| Boston
| W 122–104
|
|
|
| The Spectrum
| 36–9

|- align="center" bgcolor="#ccffcc"
| 46
| February 1, 1985
| Chicago
| W 121–110
|
|
|
| The Spectrum
| 37–9
|- align="center" bgcolor="#ffcccc"
| 47
| February 2, 1985
| @ New Jersey
| L 96–101
|
|
|
| Brendan Byrne Arena
| 37–10
|- align="center" bgcolor="#ccffcc"
| 48
| February 4, 1985
| Atlanta
| W 106–92
|
|
|
| The Spectrum
| 38–10
|- align="center" bgcolor="#ccffcc"
| 49
| February 6, 1985
| Washington
| W 116–111
|
|
|
| The Spectrum
| 39–10
|- align="center"
|colspan="9" bgcolor="#bbcaff"|All-Star Break
|- style="background:#cfc;"
|- bgcolor="#bbffbb"
|- align="center" bgcolor="#ccffcc"
| 50
| February 12, 1985
| @ Indiana
| W 124–116
|
|
|
| Market Square Arena
| 40–10
|- align="center" bgcolor="#ccffcc"
| 51
| February 13, 1985
| New York
| W 131–129
|
|
|
| The Spectrum
| 41–10
|- align="center" bgcolor="#ffcccc"
| 52
| February 15, 1985
| Cleveland
| L 107–112
|
|
|
| The Spectrum
| 41–11
|- align="center" bgcolor="#ccffcc"
| 53
| February 16, 1985
| @ Detroit
| W 125–114
|
|
|
| Pontiac Silverdome
| 42–11
|- align="center" bgcolor="#ffcccc"
| 54
| February 18, 1985
| @ Cleveland
| L 113–120
|
|
|
| Richfield Coliseum
| 42–12
|- align="center" bgcolor="#ccffcc"
| 55
| February 20, 1985
| Golden State
| W 137–116
|
|
|
| The Spectrum
| 43–12
|- align="center" bgcolor="#ccffcc"
| 56
| February 22, 1985
| Detroit
| W 110–99
|
|
|
| The Spectrum
| 44–12
|- align="center" bgcolor="#ccffcc"
| 57
| February 24, 1985
| Utah
| W 117–108
|
|
|
| The Spectrum
| 45–12
|- align="center" bgcolor="#ffcccc"
| 58
| February 26, 1985
| @ Milwaukee
| L 97–116
|
|
|
| MECCA Arena
| 45–13
|- align="center" bgcolor="#ccffcc"
| 59
| February 28, 1985
| @ Kansas City
| W 127–119
|
|
|
| Kemper Arena
| 46–13

|- align="center" bgcolor="#ffcccc"
| 60
| March 3, 1985
| @ Houston
| L 90–99
|
|
|
| The Summit
| 46–14
|- align="center" bgcolor="#ffcccc"
| 61
| March 4, 1985
| @ San Antonio
| L 103–109
|
|
|
| HemisFair Arena
| 46–15
|- align="center" bgcolor="#ccffcc"
| 62
| March 6, 1985
| Atlanta
| W 96–86
|
|
|
| The Spectrum
| 47–15
|- align="center" bgcolor="#ccffcc"
| 63
| March 8, 1985
| Seattle
| W 128–114
|
|
|
| The Spectrum
| 48–15
|- align="center" bgcolor="#ffcccc"
| 64
| March 9, 1985
| @ New York
| L 129–131 (2OT)
|
|
|
| Madison Square Garden
| 48–16
|- align="center" bgcolor="#ccffcc"
| 65
| March 13, 1985
| L.A. Clippers
| W 121–103
|
|
|
| The Spectrum
| 49–16
|- align="center" bgcolor="#ccffcc"
| 66
| March 15, 1985
| New York
| W 119–110
|
|
|
| The Spectrum
| 50–16
|- align="center" bgcolor="#ccffcc"
| 67
| March 16, 1985
| New Jersey
| W 127–107
|
|
|
| The Spectrum
| 51–16
|- align="center" bgcolor="#ffcccc"
| 68
| March 19, 1985
| @ Cleveland
| L 89–116
|
|
|
| Richfield Coliseum
| 51–17
|- align="center" bgcolor="#ffcccc"
| 69
| March 20, 1985
| Kansas City
| L 117–118 (OT)
|
|
|
| The Spectrum
| 51–18
|- align="center" bgcolor="#ffcccc"
| 70
| March 22, 1985
| Milwaukee
| L 112–131
|
|
|
| The Spectrum
| 51–19
|- align="center" bgcolor="#ccffcc"
| 71
| March 24, 1985
| Denver
| W 124–103
|
|
|
| The Spectrum
| 52–19
|- align="center" bgcolor="#ccffcc"
| 72
| March 27, 1985
| Washington
| W 115–97
|
|
|
| The Spectrum
| 53–19
|- align="center" bgcolor="#ffcccc"
| 73
| March 29, 1985
| @ Boston
| L 108–112
|
|
|
| Boston Garden
| 53–20
|- align="center" bgcolor="#ccffcc"
| 74
| March 30, 1985
| @ Chicago
| W 122–117
|
|
|
| Chicago Stadium
| 54–20

|- align="center" bgcolor="#ccffcc"
| 75
| April 2, 1985
| @ Atlanta
| W 102–91
|
|
|
| The Omni
| 55–20
|- align="center" bgcolor="#ffcccc"
| 76
| April 3, 1985
| Cleveland
| L 110–113
|
|
|
| The Spectrum
| 55–21
|- align="center" bgcolor="#ccffcc"
| 77
| April 5, 1985
| Chicago
| W 116–113
|
|
|
| The Spectrum
| 56–21
|- align="center" bgcolor="#ffcccc"
| 78
| April 6, 1985
| @ Indiana
| L 117–121
|
|
|
| Market Square Arena
| 56–22
|- align="center" bgcolor="#ccffcc"
| 79
| April 9, 1985
| Boston
| W 113–104
|
|
|
| The Spectrum
| 57–22
|- align="center" bgcolor="#ffcccc"
| 80
| April 10, 1985
| @ New Jersey
| L 100–125
|
|
|
| Brendan Byrne Arena
| 57–23
|- align="center" bgcolor="#ccffcc"
| 81
| April 12, 1985
| Indiana
| W 111–105
|
|
|
| The Spectrum
| 58–23
|- align="center" bgcolor="#ffcccc"
| 82
| April 13, 1985
| @ Washington
| L 106–118
|
|
|
| Capital Centre
| 58–24

Playoffs

|- align="center" bgcolor="#ccffcc"
| 1
| April 17, 1985
| Washington
| W 104–97
| Moses Malone (26)
| Charles Barkley (12)
| Maurice Cheeks (6)
| The Spectrum7,170
| 1–0
|- align="center" bgcolor="#ccffcc"
| 2
| April 21, 1985
| Washington
| W 113–94
| Andrew Toney (31)
| Malone, Barkley (14)
| Maurice Cheeks (5)
| The Spectrum9,612
| 2–0
|- align="center" bgcolor="#ffcccc"
| 3
| April 24, 1985
| @ Washington
| L 100–118
| Moses Malone (17)
| Charles Barkley (11)
| Andrew Toney (5)
| Capital Centre11,103
| 2–1
|- align="center" bgcolor="#ccffcc"
| 4
| April 26, 1985
| @ Washington
| W 106–98
| Julius Erving (25)
| Charles Barkley (14)
| Clint Richardson (4)
| Capital Centre12,238
| 3–1
|-

|- align="center" bgcolor="#ccffcc"
| 1
| April 28, 1985
| @ Milwaukee
| W 127–105
| Moses Malone (27)
| Charles Barkley (8)
| Maurice Cheeks (9)
| MECCA Arena11,052
| 1–0
|- align="center" bgcolor="#ccffcc"
| 2
| April 30, 1985
| @ Milwaukee
| W 112–108
| Moses Malone (25)
| Julius Erving (10)
| Maurice Cheeks (9)
| MECCA Arena11,052
| 2–0
|- align="center" bgcolor="#ccffcc"
| 3
| May 3, 1985
| Milwaukee
| W 109–104
| Andrew Toney (20)
| Moses Malone (13)
| Toney, Cheeks (7)
| The Spectrum14,188
| 3–0
|- align="center" bgcolor="#ccffcc"
| 4
| May 5, 1985
| Milwaukee
| W 121–112
| Moses Malone (31)
| Moses Malone (13)
| Andrew Toney (11)
| The Spectrum15,264
| 4–0
|-

|- align="center" bgcolor="#ffcccc"
| 1
| May 12, 1985
| @ Boston
| L 93–108
| Maurice Cheeks (27)
| Charles Barkley (12)
| Maurice Cheeks (7)
| Boston Garden14,890
| 0–1
|- align="center" bgcolor="#ffcccc"
| 2
| May 14, 1985
| @ Boston
| L 98–106
| Julius Erving (22)
| Moses Malone (13)
| Cheeks, Erving (7)
| Boston Garden14,890
| 0–2
|- align="center" bgcolor="#ffcccc"
| 3
| May 18, 1985
| Boston
| L 94–105
| Andrew Toney (26)
| Moses Malone (16)
| Andrew Toney (5)
| The Spectrum17,921
| 0–3
|- align="center" bgcolor="#ccffcc"
| 4
| May 19, 1985
| Boston
| W 115–104
| Andrew Toney (26)
| Charles Barkley (20)
| Julius Erving (6)
| The Spectrum17,921
| 1–3
|- align="center" bgcolor="#ffcccc"
| 5
| May 22, 1985
| @ Boston
| L 100–102
| Maurice Cheeks (26)
| Moses Malone (15)
| Cheeks, Toney (6)
| Boston Garden14,890
| 1–4
|-

Award winners
 Charles Barkley, NBA All-Rookie Team 1st Team
 Maurice Cheeks, NBA All-Defensive First Team
 Bobby Jones, NBA All-Defensive Second Team
 Moses Malone, All-NBA First Team

References

 Philadelphia 76ers on Basketball Reference

Philadelphia
Philadelphia 76ers seasons
Philadelphia
Philadelphia